Victoria Hamilton (born 5 April 1971) is an English actress.  

After training at the London Academy of Music and Dramatic Art, Hamilton began her career in classical theatre, appearing in productions with the Royal Shakespeare Company and the National Theatre. In 2002, she appeared in the London stage play A Day in the Death of Joe Egg alongside Clive Owen and later Eddie Izzard.

She made her Broadway debut in 2003 when the production moved to New York, where she earned a Tony Award nomination. She won the Critics' Circle Theatre Award and Evening Standard Theatre Award for her performance in the play Suddenly, Last Summer, held in 2004 at the Lyceum Theatre.

Hamilton has often worked in the costume drama genre. During the 1990s, she had supporting roles in three Jane Austen adaptations: the 1995 serial Pride and Prejudice, the 1995 film Persuasion, and the 1999 film Mansfield Park.

Hamilton won the role of Queen Victoria in the 2001 television production, Victoria & Albert, portraying the monarch in her early years. From 2008 to 2011, Hamilton was a cast member in the BBC1 series Lark Rise to Candleford. In 2016-17, she portrayed Queen Elizabeth The Queen Mother in the Netflix historical drama series The Crown.

Career
Hamilton was born on 5 April 1971 in Wimbledon, London to a non-theatrical family. She attended St Hilary's School, a private school in Surrey, from 1974 to 1982, then Prior's Field School, Godalming, until 1987.

She initially intended to read English at Bristol University, before opting to train at the London Academy of Music and Dramatic Art. She began her acting career in classical theatre, spending the first five years appearing in productions by companies such as the Royal Shakespeare Company and the National Theatre. She stayed with the Royal Shakespeare Company for eighteen months. She commented in 2001 that it was "very unfashionable" to begin a career in classical theatre, but she had sought to emulate the careers of actors like Judi Dench and Ian Holm who "started in rep and slowly built themselves into the position where they could juggle theatre and film".

Stage
In 1995, Hamilton appeared in Ibsen's The Master Builder directed by Peter Hall, starring Alan Bates and Gemma Jones and performed at the Haymarket Theatre in the West End of London. The Independent described Hamilton as a "formidable talent" despite being a newcomer, and noted that she had previously appeared in two performances held at the Orange Tree Theatre in London, one of them being an adaptation of a play by James Saunders. The Master Builder earned Hamilton the London Critics Circle Theatre Award for Most Promising Newcomer. In 2000 she received the Critics' Circle Theatre Award for her performance in As You Like It, Crucible Theatre.

She made her Broadway debut in the 2003 play A Day in the Death of Joe Egg, co-starring alongside the comedian Eddie Izzard. She had starred with Clive Owen, and later Izzard, in a successful London production of the play the previous year, in which she and Izzard portray the parents of a girl with severe brain damage who attempt to save their marriage through jokes and black comedy. For her performance in the Broadway adaptation, Hamilton received a nomination for Tony Award for Best Actress in a Play.

The following year she appeared in Suddenly, Last Summer (2004), an adaptation of the Tennessee Williams play, performed at the Lyceum Theatre in Sheffield. For her performance, she was honoured as Best Actress by winning the Critics' Circle Theatre Award and Evening Standard Theatre Award. Her success led some of the media to brand her as "the next Judi Dench".

Hamilton took a three-year break from the stage before returning as Viola in the Shakespearean comedy Twelfth Night (2008), staged at Wyndham's Theatre in the West End of London.

Television and film
Hamilton is known for working in the costume drama genre. In 2001, she joked that she had been in corsets for the preceding seven years.

During the 1990s, she had supporting roles in three adaptations of Jane Austen's novels. These include the 1995 serial Pride and Prejudice as Mrs Forster, the 1995 film Persuasion as Henrietta Musgrove, and the 1999 film Mansfield Park as Maria Bertram.

She won the role of Queen Victoria in the 2001 BBC TV production Victoria & Albert, despite facing strong competition and being relatively unknown at the time. She auditioned with the director John Erman in a London hotel suite, and after reading lines from several more scenes at his prompting, was offered the part immediately. Noting that the monarch is typically depicted as stern and stout, Hamilton desired to show a younger version who "loved parties and balls and theatre and opera and new dresses" after a childhood spent in a "forbidding environment".

In 2005, she appeared in the three-part miniseries To the Ends of the Earth alongside Benedict Cumberbatch and Jared Harris. The production, an adaptation of the novels of the same name by William Golding, featured various self-absorbed characters who are forced to remain in close quarters while sailing on a ship to Australia during the Napoleonic Wars. Hamilton described the production as having "some of the most beautiful scripts I've seen", and called her character Miss Granham "one of the strongest people on the boat".

From 2008 to 2011, she appeared in the BBC1 series Lark Rise to Candleford as Ruby Pratt, one of two spinster sisters who run a high fashion shop in a small 19th-century town. The Guardian deemed Ruby's rivalry with her sister Pearl (played by Matilda Ziegler) as a highlight of the series, believing both actresses portrayed their characters with "infectious relish". In 2013, Hamilton played Peggy in the BBC drama series What Remains.

In 2015, she appeared in the BBC1 drama, Doctor Foster, playing Anna Baker, a woman who lived across the road from the central characters, Gemma and Simon Foster. She reprised her role in the second series of the drama in 2017. By the final episode, her character had moved away. 

In 2016 and 2017, she appeared in the first two seasons of the Netflix series The Crown as Queen Elizabeth The Queen Mother. The drama series, which is scheduled to span six seasons, depicts the relationship between Queen Elizabeth II and Prince Philip, Duke of Edinburgh from 1947 to the present.

Since 2020, she has starred in the Sky drama Cobra as Anna Marshall, the Downing Street Chief of Staff.

Filmography

Film

Television

Selected theatre credits

Awards and nominations

Television

Theatre

References 

Works cited

External links
 
 

1971 births
Alumni of the London Academy of Music and Dramatic Art
Critics' Circle Theatre Award winners
English film actresses
English radio actresses
English stage actresses
English television actresses
Living people
People from Godalming
People from Wimbledon, London
Actresses from Surrey
Actors from London
Royal Shakespeare Company members
English Shakespearean actresses
People educated at Prior's Field School
Theatre World Award winners